The women's keirin competition at the 2014 Asian Games was held on 21 September 2014 at the Incheon International Velodrome.

Schedule
All times are Korea Standard Time (UTC+09:00)

Results
Legend
REL — Relegated

First round

Heat 1

Heat 2

Finals

Final 7–11

Final 1–6

Final standing

References 
Results

External links 
 

Track Women keirin